Galeana is a genus of Mesoamerican flowering plants in the daisy family.

 Species
 Galeana hastata La Llave - Veracruz
 Galeana pratensis (Kunth) Rydb. - Mexico + Central America from Nayarit to Costa Rica

References

Asteraceae genera
Perityleae
Flora of North America